The following table presents a list of Nigeria's state governors. Governors are elected for a term of four years (maximum of two terms). A minister appointed by the president oversees affairs in the Federal Capital Territory.

Eligibility
Citizen of Nigeria by birth, at least 35 years of age, is a member of a political party and is sponsored by that political party are eligible for the office of Governor. The constitution limits state governors to only two four-year terms in office.

Oath of office
The Constitution of Nigeria specifies an oath of office for the State Governors of Nigeria:

List of current state governors
The current party affiliation of the 36 state governors is:
21 All Progressive Congress (APC)
14 People's Democratic Party (PDP)
1 All Progressives Grand Alliance (APGA)

Notes

See also
States in Nigeria
List of governors of former Nigerian states

Progressive Governors Forum (PGF)

References

 
State governors
Nigeria

de:Liste der Gouverneure der nigerianischen Bundesstaaten
fr:Liste des dirigeants des États du Nigeria
ig:Ndetu ndi ishi ọchịchị ȯra Naigiria
yo:Àkójọ àwọn gómìnà ìpínlẹ̀ Nàìjíríà